Iron Bird or iron bird may refer to:

 Iron Bird, the title of an episode of the List of Monster Rancher episodes
 Eisenvogel, literally Iron Bird, the title of the Swiss-Tibetan book by Yangzom Brauen
 Iron bird (aviation), a test rig used to prototype aircraft systems under development